Braden Birch (born September 25, 1989) is a Canadian ice hockey defenceman. His is currently playing with HIFK in the Finnish Liiga. Birch was selected by the Chicago Blackhawks in the 6th round (179th overall) of the 2008 NHL Entry Draft.

Birch made his Liiga debut playing with HIFK during the 2013–14 Liiga season.

References

External links

1989 births
Living people
Canadian ice hockey defencemen
Chicago Blackhawks draft picks
Florida Panthers
HIFK (ice hockey) players
Ice hockey people from Ontario
Sportspeople from Hamilton, Ontario
Canadian expatriate ice hockey players in Finland